Çalburun (also, Chalburun) is a village and municipality in the Gadabay Rayon of Azerbaijan.  It has a population of 1,800.

References 

Populated places in Gadabay District